Matthew Smithard (born 13 June 1976) is an English former professional footballer who played as a midfielder.

Career
Born in Leeds, Smithard began his career with the youth team of hometown club Leeds United, winning the 1993 FA Youth Cup. However, he never played a first-team game for the club, and Smithard began his professional career during the 1996–97 season with Bradford City, making one appearance for them in the Football League. After dropping down to non-League football due to injury, Smithard played with a number of teams including Farsley Celtic, Ossett Town and Guiseley.

References
General

Specific

1976 births
Living people
Footballers from Leeds
English footballers
Leeds United F.C. players
Bradford City A.F.C. players
Farsley Celtic A.F.C. players
Ossett Town F.C. players
Guiseley A.F.C. players
English Football League players
Association football midfielders